This is a list of properties on the Alabama Register of Landmarks and Heritage, sorted alphabetically by county.  This list contains all entries for Jefferson County through Macon County, the other listings may be found here.  The Alabama Register of Landmarks and Heritage is an official listing of buildings, sites, structures, objects, and districts deemed worthy of preservation in the U.S. state of Alabama.

These properties, which may be of national, state, and local significance, are designated by the Alabama Historical Commission, under the authority of the Alabama Legislature.  General criteria for inclusion in the Alabama Register includes that the property is at least 40 years old; is associated with events of state or local significance; is associated with the lives of persons of state or local significance; is representative of a type, style, or period of architecture; or is associated with Alabama's history or prehistory.  It must also possess integrity of location and construction and convey a feeling for the time and place of construction.

The Alabama Register occasionally includes properties that do not meet the general criteria for inclusion, such as moved or reconstructed structures. These properties are included when they have been sensitively relocated to a site similar to the original, closely match the construction of the original significant building, or are of exceptional importance to the state.

There are approximately 1496 properties and districts listed on the Alabama Register. Of these, approximately 196 are also listed on the National Register of Historic Places (NRHP) and 5 are designated as National Historic Landmarks (NHL).



Jefferson County

Lamar County

Lauderdale County

Lawrence County

Lee County

Limestone County

Lowndes County

Macon County

See also
Properties on the Alabama Register of Landmarks and Heritage by county (Autauga–Choctaw)
Properties on the Alabama Register of Landmarks and Heritage by county (Clarke–Dallas)
Properties on the Alabama Register of Landmarks and Heritage by county (DeKalb–Jackson)
Properties on the Alabama Register of Landmarks and Heritage by county (Madison–Perry)
Properties on the Alabama Register of Landmarks and Heritage by county (Pickens–Winston)

References

External links
Alabama Historical Commission

Properties on the Alabama Register of Landmarks and Heritage by county